Wilby is a village and civil parish in the Mid Suffolk district of Suffolk in eastern England located around  south-east of Diss and  south of Stradbroke along the B1118. The population of the parish at the 2001 census was 231 in 99 households. The village has some basic services including a primary school and village hall. 

The nearest villages are Brundish, Laxfield, Stradbroke and Worlingworth. Foals Green, Russel's Green, Stanway Green and Wootten Green (part) form part of the village which is dispersed in nature.

History
The name of the village is generally believed to be derived from the Old English meaning 'Ring of Willows'. The village is mentioned in the Domesday Book at which time it comprised seven households and formed part of the holding of William de Beaufeu, Bishop of Thetford. 

In 1844, White's Directories lists Thomas Corbett (Lincolnshire MP) as lord of the manor

Church
The village church is dedicated to St Mary. It is medieval in origin and includes a 15th-century tower and a series of bench ends from the same century which are one of the finest collections in East Anglia. The current vicar is Rev'd David Burrell who holds one Sunday service a week. St Mary's is a Grade I listed building. Newton Wilby Hall, a Grade II listed building, is a 16th-century farmhouse with an intact medieval moat.

School
The village school serves around 100 children aged 5 to 11. It is currently judged as 'Good' by Ofsted and has a link to a school in Mbauro in Kenya. At 11 children usually transfer to Stradbroke High School.

Village hall
The village hall, which stands on the B1118, close to the centre of the village and opposite the school, is named Coronation Hall to commemorate the coronation of Her Majesty Queen Elizabeth II. Officially opened on Saturday 28 May 1955, it was one of the first village halls in Suffolk to be made by voluntary labour.

Transport
Between 1908 and 1952 the village was served by Wilby railway station on the Mid-Suffolk Light Railway with the nearest operational railway station now at Diss.

References

External links
Wilby's Website

Villages in Suffolk
Civil parishes in Suffolk
Mid Suffolk District